WCDH (91.5 FM, "Family Life Network") is a radio station broadcasting a contemporary Christian music format. Licensed to Shenandoah, Pennsylvania, United States, the station is currently owned by Family Life Ministries, Inc. and features programming from Salem Radio Network.

History
In 2013, Family Life Ministries sold the translator, W234AX, to WODE-FM.

References

External links
 
 

Contemporary Christian radio stations in the United States
Schuylkill County, Pennsylvania
Radio stations established in 2008
2008 establishments in Pennsylvania
CDH